The Fourth (Unity) Congress of the Russian Social Democratic Labour Party that took place in (old) Folkets hus, Stockholm, Sweden, from 10-25 April (23 April to 8 May), 1906. 

The Congress was attended by 112 delegates with the right to vote, who represented 57 local Party organisations and 22 delegates with voice but no vote. Other participants were delegates from various national Social-Democratic parties: three each from the Social-Democrats of Poland and Lithuania, the Bund and the Lettish Social Democratic Labour Party, one each from the Ukrainian Social-Democratic Labour Party and the Finnish Labour Party, and also a representative of the Social Democratic Labour Party of Bulgaria. Among the Bolshevik delegates were Vladimir Lenin, Alexander Bogdanov, Leonid Krassin, Mikhail Frunze, Mikhail Kalinin, Nadezhda Konstantinovna Krupskaya, Anatoly Lunacharsky, Fyodor Sergeyev (Artyom), S. G. Shaumyan, Ivan Skvortsov-Stepanov, Joseph Stalin, Kliment Voroshilov, Maxim Litvinov and V. V. Vorovsky. The main items on the Congress agenda were the agrarian question, an appraisal of the current situation and the class tasks of the proletariat, the attitude to the Duma, and organisational matters. There was a bitter controversy between the Bolsheviks and Mensheviks over every item. Lenin made reports and speeches on the agrarian question, the current situation, and tactics regarding the Duma elections, the armed uprising, and other questions. 

The preponderance of Mensheviks at the Congress, while slight, determined its character; the Congress adopted Menshevik resolutions on a number of questions (the agrarian programme, the attitude to the Duma, etc.). The Congress approved the first clause of the Rules concerning Party membership in the wording proposed by Lenin. It admitted the Social-Democratic organisations of Poland and Lithuania and the Lettish Social-Democratic Labour Party into the RSDLP, and predetermined the admission of the Bund.

The Congress elected a Central Committee of three Bolsheviks and seven Mensheviks, and a Menshevik editorial board of Central Body.

References
Vladimir Lenin, Collected Works, 4th English Edition, Progress Publishers, Moscow, 1972
V. I. Lenin The Unity Congress of the R.S.D.L.P., "Marxists Internet Archive" (some text is integrated from this source)

External links 
Protocols of the 4th Congress in Russian

1906 in Sweden
1906 conferences
Congresses of the Russian Social Democratic Labour Party
April 1906 events